This is a list of slums in Pakistan.

Parts of Orangi. However, only some parts can be characterized as slums, now it is a municipality.
Parts of Machar Colony
Parts of Lyari Town

See also

 List of slums

References

Pakistan
Poverty in Pakistan
Slums
Slums